The Municipal Theatre of Ho Chi Minh City, also known as Saigon Municipal Opera House, is an opera house in Ho Chi Minh City, Vietnam. It is an example of French Colonial architecture in Vietnam.

Built in 1897 by French architect Eugène Ferret as the Opéra de Saïgon, the 500 seat building was served as the house of the unicameral National Assembly from 1956 to 1967 and then as bicameral houses: Lower House (Hạ Nghị Viện) and a Senate or Upper House (Thượng Nghị Viện) of the National Assembly of South Vietnam after 1956. And also held the People's Assembly (Đại hội đại biểu Nhân dân) of the Republic of South Vietnam from 1975. It was not until 1976 that it was again used as a theatre, and the façade was restored in 1995.

Architecture

The Municipal Theatre is a smaller counterpart of the Hanoi Opera House, which was built between 1901 and 1911, and shaped like the Opéra Garnier in Paris with 800 seats to entertain French colonists. The Municipal Theatre owes its specific characteristics to the work of architect Félix Olivier, while construction was under supervision of architects Ernest Guichard and Eugène Ferret in 1900.

Its architectural style is influenced by the flamboyant style of the French Third Republic, with the façade shaped like the Petit Palais which was built in the same year in France. The house had a main seating floor plus two levels of seating above, and once was capable of accommodating 1,800 people. The design of all the inscriptions, décor, and furnishings were drawn by a French artist and sent from France.

In accordance with the style employed, the façade of the theatre was decorated with inscription and reliefs (like the Ho Chi Minh City Hall), but it was criticized as being too ornate. In 1943 some of this decoration was removed, but a portion was restored by the city government for the 300th anniversary of Saigon in 1998. Today the capacity of the opera house is 500 seats.

History
After the invasion of Cochinchina and the establishment of a colony, in 1863 French colonists invited a theatre company to Saigon to perform for the French legion in the villa of the French admiral at the Clock Square (Place de l'Horloge) (presently the corner of Nguyen Du and Dong Khoi streets). After a short time, a temporary theatre was built at the site of what is now the Caravelle Hotel. In 1898, the construction of the new theatre commenced on the site of the old one, and it was completed by 1 January 1900.

Between World War I and World War II, all costs of mobilization and demobilization as well as other costs for the theatre companies from France to Saigon were paid by the municipal government. Despite the fact that the theatre was planned as an entertainment venue for the growing middle class, its audience declined as more and more night clubs and dance halls boomed in the city. During this period, performances were presented only occasionally, some being concerts and other cai luong programs.

Following criticisms of the theatre's façade and the high costs of organizing performances, the municipal government intended to turn the theatre into a concert hall (Salle de Concert), but this was never carried out. Instead, decorations, engravings and statues were removed from the theatre façade in 1943 to make the theatre look more youthful. In 1944, the theatre was damaged by the Allied aerial attacks against Japanese Imperial Army, and the theatre stopped functioning. As Japan surrendered to the Allied forces, France returned to Cochinchina. In 1954, the French defeat at the Battle of Dien Bien Phu led to the Geneva Accords in the same year. The theatre was then used as a temporary shelter for French civilians arriving from North Vietnam.

In 1955, the theatre was restored as the seat of the Lower House of the State of Vietnam, then the Republic of Vietnam. After the Fall of Saigon in 1975, the Provisional Revolutionary Government started holding the People's Assembly at the theatre. After the Reunification of Vietnam in 1976, the building was restored to its original function as a theatre. In 1998, on the occasion of 300th anniversary of the founding of Saigon, the municipal government had the theatre façade restored.

In 2020, Ho Chi Minh City Metro's Opera House Station opened to public viewing, with Line 1 operations scheduled to begin in 2023.

See also
 Hanoi Opera House
 Haiphong Opera House

External links

Ho Chi Minh City Ballet Symphony Orchestra and Opera – Official website
A O Show – Lune Production – Official website

References

Buildings and structures in Ho Chi Minh City
French colonial architecture in Vietnam
Opera houses in Vietnam
Tourist attractions in Ho Chi Minh City
Music venues completed in 1897
Theatres completed in 1897
Former seats of national legislatures